Word usage is the way a word, phrase, or concept is used in a language or language variety. Lexicographers gather samples of written instances where a word is used and analyze them to determine patterns of regional or social usage as well as meaning. A word, for example the English word "donny" (a round rock about the size of a man's head), may be only a rare regional usage, or a word may be used worldwide by standard English speakers and have one or several evolving definitions.

Word usage may also involve grammar.

See also
 List of English words with disputed usage
 Text mining
 Predictive analytics

Lexicology
Syntactic entities